"Afterski" is the debut single from Norwegian DJ and electronic music duo Broiler. It was released in Norway on 15 November 2012 for digital download. The song peaked at number 3 on the Norwegian Singles Chart. The song is included on their debut studio album The Beginning (2013)

Music video
A music video to accompany the release of "Afterski" was first released onto YouTube on 15 November 2012 at a total length of five minutes and eights seconds.

Track listing

Chart performance

Weekly charts

Release history

References

2012 singles
DJ Broiler songs
2012 songs